The 2015 Tulsa Roughnecks FC season was the club's first season of existence, and their first in the United Soccer League in the third division of American soccer. Including the previous iterations of franchises named "Tulsa Roughnecks", this was the 15th season of a soccer club named the "Roughnecks" playing in the Tulsa metropolitan area.

Outside of the USL, the Roughnecks participated in the 2015 U.S. Open Cup.

Roster

Competitions

USL

Standings

Results

U.S. Open Cup

References 

2015 USL season
2015
2015 in sports in Oklahoma
American soccer clubs 2015 season